StepManiaX (abbreviated SMX and pronounced "Step Maniacs") is a rhythm game developed & published by Step Revolution, a studio formed by former developers of In the Groove, ReRave, and Pump It Up Pro. It is considered a spiritual successor to the In the Groove series. The name is a nod to the legacy of the open-source simulator StepMania, as many of the original StepMania developers were involved with the project. StepManiaX is derived from the same codebase, with modifications made to support the new game types, lights, touch support, connectivity, and the custom Android operating system and hardware that dedicated units run on.

Gameplay

Similar to other stepping or dance-based games, StepManiaX uses a "stage" that the user stands on with certain areas being pressure-sensitive buttons, or "panels". StepManiaX uses five identically sized inputs, arranged similarly to a Directional Pad - Up, Down, Left, Right, and the inclusion of Center.

Players can select between seven different difficulty levels that affect how many inputs are active and the difficulty of patterns displayed. Players can also customize modifiers adjust to their preferred style, such as changing the visual appearance of patterns, how fast patterns appear, background brightness, etc.

The core gameplay involves players stepping on the panel with their feet to correspond with the scrolling arrows (or "Notes") on-screen once they reach the end of beat lines (horizontal bars that move up the screen). During normal gameplay, arrows scroll upwards from the bottom of the screen towards the end of the play area, towards a set of receptor markers on the sides of the arrow lanes. When these scrolling arrows reach the end, the player must step on the corresponding arrows on the dance stage, and the player is given a judgement for their accuracy of the input. Each note judged has multiple "windows" that it can be categorized into. These, from most accurate to least, are: PERFECT!!, PERFECT, EARLY, LATE, and MISS. Any judgement that is not "PERFECT!!" will show an indicator if the input was registered early or late compared to the intended timing.

Stepping accurately will contribute to the player's life bar, visible on the edge of the screen. Missing notes will cause a player's lifebar to decrease. If a player's lifebar empties entirely, scoring will halt and the song will no longer be able to be "passed" for that player, although the game will still continue until a player manually ends the song or the song completes.

Additional note types are also included with StepManiaX's gameplay.

Holds - Notes that have longer, extended trails following the initial directional indicator. Players must keep the corresponding direction depressed for the duration of the trail. Similar to Pump It Up, holds continuously generate combo for the player while being held down and also have the ability to be re-stepped on if the player was to accidentally release the hold before being completed. If the player releases the hold at any time, the player will instead receive a yellow "!" judgement, regardless if it is being held at the end. Successfully completing a hold will generate a green checkmark judgement. Continuously failing to hold the indicated direction will decrease the player's health bar significantly, and will continue to deplete until the direction is pressed
Rolls -  Similar in appearance to a hold, but typically displayed visibly as spiky. Rolls display a number of times a panel must be hit before it ends - this is indicated by a number attached to the top of the roll. For example, if the number shows 3, you must hit that same panel 3 times before that Roll ends.
Mines - Displayed as a circular shape with a red 'X' through it, these notes must be avoided. The button that the column corresponds to must not be touched (hit or held) at any point until the mine passes. Avoiding the mines generate a checkmark, while failing to avoid generate a "X" that punishes you. Avoiding mines will award the player a small point value.
Pits - Combining both Holds and Mines, pits are "long mines" that will punish a player if they hold down the indicated direction while the pit is scrolling past the end of the playfield. Continuously holding down a direction while a pit is active will punish a player by severely decreasing their health bar the longer it is held. Completely avoiding a pit will award the player a small point value.
Lifts - Typically placed at the end of ahold. Appropriately named, the player is expected to lift off the panel at the precise time the lift reaches the end of the playfield. Successfully lifting will reward a green checkmark judgement and a small point bonus, while failing to do so will reward a yellow "!" and no points.

Completing a song while a player still has energy remaining in their health bar will award a "pass" to the player. The player is taken to the Results Screen, which rates the player's performance with a star rating (between one and six stars, with a specialized design for players who achieve the maximum score of 100,000 points), the points earned (between 0 and 100,000, which can be interpreted as a percentage by dividing by 1000), and specific judgement statistics.

Modes

There are seven modes to play:

For single-stage format, beginner mode exists to get newcomers to play and cater to freestylers, while using just three panels: left, center, and right. Easy adds the up and down panels, making all five panels available to play. Hard makes the different colored rhythm panels more common and may add a few advanced features like pits. Wild further increasing the difficulty while making additional features more common.

Unlike single-pad, double-stage formats have no difficulty restrictions. Dual Mode is a new mode introduced to dance games that uses six panels, with both ups and downs not present. Full Mode uses all ten panels. Team Mode is like Full, but requires two players to play based on the color of the panels, with both players sharing the same lifebar and same score.

During development, "Beginner" mode was titled "Basic". This was later updated to ease new players into the game. The original difficulty scale was also adjusted from a 1-10 scale to allow for more range in Beginner and Easy charts.

Announced at IAAPA 2022, + (plus) charts such as Hard+ will be added to songs. Although rare and on certain songs, this is intended to fill the void on difficulty gaps.

Development

Development of StepManiaX started with stage development in early 2015. Several different designs were prototyped using various sensor technologies, including an aluminum slim-line stage. This design was officially shown to the public by project lead Kyle Ward in early 2016. Later that year, the retail version of the stage was shown, sporting a thicker, more durable steel stage design. During this period, the StepManiaX software was being developed in tandem with hardware development. The goal of the software was to create a simple interface that was accessible for all ranges of players. The game then grew its design to appeal to a wide variety of locations: Home, Health & Fitness, Education, Competitive E-Sports, and Family Recreation. The title "StepManiaX" was selected to focus on the aerobic stepping aspect of the game.

The game's first public showing was during MAGFest 2017.

StepManiaX was released in June, 2017, but access to the game was very limited. Initially targeting fitness and recreational facilities, the game was installed at various family-oriented locations. During this time, the all-in-one cabinet design was exhibited at various trade fairs and gaming events like Gamescom 2017 as sales were limited due to stock shortages and gauging interest with distribution partners. Multiple waves of sales for consumer use eventually led to home users acquiring hardware, as sales were not limited to organizations or certain environments. The following year, a coin-operated version of the game premiered at 8 on the Break as an initial location and hardware test. This cabinet revision also premiered commercially at IAAPA 2019. Since then, the game is available directly via the developer's web store and through various distribution partners.

Step Revolution unveiled the large LX Cabinet at IAAPA 2022.

Hardware
There are currently three StepManiaX machines available:
 Compact (formerly All-In-One) machines are designed for free play. They feature a 43" touch screen monitor and a 2.1 sound system. All-In-One machines are the sole models featuring headphone ports, with one for each player along with individual volume control.
 Dedicated machines are designed for free or paid play, as they accept token coins or equivalent. The monitor is identical to the one used in Compact machines, but Dedicated machines feature a 4.2 sound system and a larger cabinet console.
 Deluxe machines were announced at IAAPA Expo 2022. They feature a 65" touch screen monitor and a 8.1 sound system. Like the dedicated machines, they support free or paid play.

While StepManiaX is intended to act as a complete product that includes both the game and the hardware needed to play it, individual parts can be bought and used on their own with other products.

The StepManiaX stage features five pressable panels by default: Up, down, left, right, center. An additional kit can be purchased to make the diagonals pressable as well. An additional pad can be purchased to play doubles mode.

The stage is fully compatible with various simulators such as StepMania, Project OutFox, MAME, or any application capable of using HID Joystick input.

Due to its breakout wiring, StepManiaX stages can be modified to completely bypass the USB output and natively work with other I/O solutions. This allows stages to be used with older home consoles, or even as replacements for stages on official Pump It Up cabinets.

Music

The soundtrack style for StepManiaX is similar in approach to other dance games such as Dance Dance Revolution, Pump It Up, ReRave, In The Groove, and iDance. The soundtrack generally consists of higher tempo music with easy to follow beats and well-defined rhythms. The song selection consists of newer songs that have never appeared in other music games, as well as older licenses that have also appeared in other music games. Alongside these older licenses are newer songs made by the same artists who worked on other music games, such as Naoki Maeda, the original sound director for Dance Dance Revolution, Yahpp, one of the original members of Pump It Up's in-house production group BanYa, and Kyle Ward, the original sound director of In The Groove.

StepManiaX originally launched with a soundtrack of 80 songs, with 31 of the 80 original songs requiring extra payment from the game owner to access. Since the initial launch, no other additional content has required an additional purchase.

Starting on March 5, 2018, StepManiaX started receiving free content updates, with the update schedule moving to a monthly cadence in April 2020. On August 17, 2021, four songs were removed from StepManiaX.

, StepManiaX features 332 standard songs, 28 premium songs, and four removed songs. Premium songs require the purchase of an expansion pack.

Reception
StepManiaX has been met with generally positive reviews, both for its hardware and the game itself.

Wilcox Arcade stated that StepManiaX is welcoming to the American arcade industry., while Arcade Heroes reported that the booth seemed popular with vendors at IAAPA 2021 

Gemu Baka praised the machine during his time at BASHCon as the best alternative to Dance Dance Revolution that still remains exclusive to Round 1 and Dave & Buster's.

Reception of StepManiaX hardware has been generally positive, citing durability, more easily adjustable sensitivity, easier maintenance, options for customization, and quality of customer support. For the dedicated game itself, the majority of the praise comes from the large song library and its focus on otherwise neglected dance music genres, and lack of subscription fees or unlocks. Internet connections are only needed for content updates and automatic upload of user scores and preferences, and so completely offline StepManiaX setups are more complete in function than their competitors.

StepManiaX has been criticized for limited supply availability and having no support for cheaper, non-standard home offerings. While stages are available on their own to private customers, restocking happens infrequently and sales periods typically only last for a few minutes. The high demand for these items increased during the COVID-19 pandemic, as many arcades remained closed or had limited reopenings.

StepManiaX's position within current family entertainment center industry trends has led to operators setting generally higher prices per credit compared to the games it is meant to replace from years prior. These pricing changes have led to criticism from dedicated players, as this new pricing is more catered to infrequent casual experiences and is less conductive to dedicated practice and repeat play.

See also 
 Dance pad
 Dance pad video games
 Roxor Games
 In the Groove (video game)

Notes

References

External links
 

2017 video games
Arcade video games
Arcade-only video games
Dance video games
Fitness games
Video games developed in the United States
Multiplayer and single-player video games